Dagoberto Fontes Figueredo (born 6 June 1943) is a Uruguayan football midfielder who played for Uruguay in the 1970 FIFA World Cup. He also played for Defensor Sporting.

References

External links
 FIFA profile

1943 births
People from Maldonado Department
Uruguayan footballers
Uruguay international footballers
Association football forwards
Defensor Sporting players
1970 FIFA World Cup players
Living people